Joe Rossi may refer to:
Joe Rossi (politician) (born 1948), member of the South Australian House of Assembly
Joe Rossi (baseball) (1921–1999), American baseball player
Joe Rossi (Peyton Place), a character in Peyton Place
Joe Rossi (American football) (born 1979), American football coach